In Greek mythology, Menestho (Ancient Greek: Μενεσθώ Menesthô) was one of the 3,000 Oceanids, water-nymph daughters of the Titans Oceanus and his sister-spouse Tethys.

Notes

Reference 

 Hesiod, Theogony from The Homeric Hymns and Homerica with an English Translation by Hugh G. Evelyn-White, Cambridge, MA.,Harvard University Press; London, William Heinemann Ltd. 1914. Online version at the Perseus Digital Library. Greek text available from the same website.

Oceanids